Bolinas Bay is a small bay, approximately 5 miles (8 km) long, on the Pacific coast of California in the United States. It is in Marin County, north of the Golden Gate, approximately 15 miles (25 km) northwest of San Francisco. The town of Bolinas is at its shore.

The bay is fed by Bolinas Lagoon, a large inner harbor protected from the main bay by a spit of land, known as Stinson Beach.

Along with nearby Drakes Bay, the bay is considered one of the possible landing spots of Francis Drake in 1579 during his circumnavigation of the world by sea.

See also

New Albion

External links
 

Bays of California
Bays of Marin County, California
Golden Gate National Recreation Area
Landforms of the San Francisco Bay Area